Camp Grayling is a military training facility located near Grayling, Michigan, primarily in Crawford County, and spread over three counties. Camp Grayling is the main training facility for the Michigan National Guard and is the largest US National Guard training facility in the United States.

History

Camp Grayling was founded in 1913 on an initial grant of land from Grayling lumber baron Rasmus Hanson to the state for military training.  It includes  in Crawford, Kalkaska and Otsego counties. 
Troops first started training at Camp Grayling in 1914.

Training events 

During the summer months, Camp Grayling hosts National Guard units from Michigan, the surrounding states, and Canada.  Large artillery, mortar, and tank ranges as well as maneuver courses highlight the camp.  Recently Forward Operating Bases have been constructed to allow company-sized units to simulate operations.

For two weeks each year starting in 2014, Camp Grayling hosts the National Guard's Exportable Combat Training Capability program. Each year, Camp Grayling schedules training for over 20,000 military personnel from National Guard units from Indiana, Illinois, Michigan, and Ohio, as well as regular Army and Reserve units.

Grayling Army Airfield is located at Camp Grayling and includes 70 helicopter tiedown pads as well as two  runways capable of handling C-130 and C-17 aircraft. Camp Grayling has over 600 soldiers in traditional Army National Guard units regularly assigned to it.

The installation provides over 200 full-time jobs to local residents. Consequently, Camp Grayling is one of the largest employers in the county. The camp activities generate over $30 million annually in the local economy.

The camp has a partnership with the Northern Michigan Law Enforcement group for training purposes. The camp has small arms ranges and urban assault ranges. Camp Grayling has an IED (improvised explosive device) Lane. This is used to train troops to protect themselves from IED’s. They have a  live fire convoy commander’s reaction course that trains commanders. The post is used for research and development.

A central attraction of Camp Grayling is Lake Margrethe.

Color Guard appearances
Camp Grayling's five-man color guard has appeared on national television alongside Anita Baker, Aretha Franklin, Dr. John, Brian McKnight, Aaron Neville, Diana Ross, Stevie Wonder, and other notable recording artists who performed the National Anthem at major sporting events held in Michigan over the years.  It provided the colors presentation for four Major League Baseball All-Star Games, eight World Series, Super Bowls XVI and XL, the 1980 Republican National Convention and the 2004 and 2005 NBA Finals.  At many aforementioned nationally televised sporting events held in Michigan, they have been joined by a Canadian military color guard, usually that of the Royal Canadian Mounted Police from Ottawa, Ontario.

Tenant Units

Camp Grayling is located in Region 6 of the Michigan Army National Guard. Its tenant units are as follows:

Joint Maneuver Training Center (ISU)
745th Explosive Ordnance Disposal 
1434th Engineer Company          
1440th Engineer Detachment      
1439th Engineer Detachment       
1442nd Engineer Detachment 
1071st Maintenance Company

Notes

External links
 Grayling Area Visitors Bureau.
Official Website

Buildings and structures in Crawford County, Michigan
Buildings and structures in Kalkaska County, Michigan
Buildings and structures in Otsego County, Michigan
Installations of the United States Army National Guard
Grayling
Military installations in Michigan
1913 establishments in Michigan